Thomas House in Escondido, California, also known as Turrentine House, was added to the National Register of Historic Places in 1992.

References

National Register of Historic Places in California
Queen Anne architecture in California
Escondido, California
Houses in San Diego County, California